The Moscow Pushkin Drama Theatre is a theatre company in Moscow, Russian Federation created in 1950 on the base of Alexander Tairov's Chamber Theatre, which was founded in 1914 and shut down in 1949 for ideological reasons. The theatre is based in the Russian capital's centre, at Tverskoy Boulevard, 23.

Background
The history of the Pushkin Drama Theatre goes back to 1914 when still relatively unknown Alexander Tairov was looking for a site for his new theatre. As the actress Alisa Koonen suggested a large house on Tverskoy, Tairov initially found it unsuitable before coming up with the idea of reconstruction, which was soon implemented into a project by the architect N.Morozov. The Chamber Theatre opened on December 12, 1914, with the production of traditional Sanskrit play Shakuntala. Problems emerged when the Russian Orthodox Church authorities expressed disapproval of the theatre's closeness to the Ioann Bogoslov Cathedral; the conflict proved to be lasting one, but did get resolved. In the 1930s the building was reconstructed (according to architects Konstantin Melnikov and the Stenberg brothers) although not as radically as Tairov wanted. The facade was simplified and became very modest looking. In 1949 the Chamber Theatre was closed, for "aestheticism and formalism", according to the official statement, as a result of the Zhdanov doctrine being put into practice.

History
In 1950, based on the former Kamerny Theatre, the Pushkin Drama Theatre emerged with a Soviet actor Vasily Vanin at the helm. Vanin, the Stalin Prize three times laureate, declared his allegiance to the Russian classics and contemporary Soviet drama and started out by staging "From a Spark", Shalva Dadiani's 1937 play about the youth of Stalin. It was followed by Stolen Happiness (Ukradennoye stchastye), by Ivan Franko. Highly popular was Vanin's version of Krechinsky's Wedding by Aleksandr Sukhovo-Kobylin in which he played Rasplyuev. This role happened to be Vanin's last: in 1952 he died.

He was succeeded by Boris Babochkin (1952-1953), whose most popular production was Shadows after Mikhail Saltykov-Shchedrin's play. Then came Iosif Tumanov (1953-1960); his best remembered production was Anton Checkov's Ivanov, starring Boris Ivanov. In 1960 Boris Ravenskikh arrived, formulating his directorial credo as "trying to wake up a poet in every man." Comedy and romanticism became the order of the day: his bright, emotional productions used music to the full effect and is now seen as a reflection of the social optimism brought about by the Sixties Thaw.

Among the Pushkin Theatre other leaders were Boris Tolmazov (1971-1978), Alexey Govorukho (1978-1983), Boris Morozov (1983-1987), Yuri Yeryomin (1987-2000) and Roman Kozak (2001-2010). Its current head is Yevgeny Pisarev.

Troupe

Past
Rodion Alexandrov (1949–1950)
Evgeny Kovalenko (II, 1949–)
Maya Ivashkevich (1949–1961)
Nikolai Prokopovich (1949–1983)
Varvara Belenkaya (1950–1962)
Stepan Bubnov (1950–1996)
Olga Viklandt (1950–1995)
Ksenya Marinina (1950–1957)
Nikolai Novlyansky (1950–1962)
Boris Smirnov (1950–1955)
Sergey Tikhonravov (1950–1966)
Boris Tchukayev (1950–1957)
Sergey Bobrov (1950–1978)
Vasily Vanin (1950–1951)
Lyudmila Genika-Chirikova (1950–1965)
Mikhail Nazvanov (1950–1957)
Georgy Petrovsky (1950–1958)
Boris Terentyev (1950–1956)
Boris Tchirkov (1950–1965)
Pyotr Berezov (1951–)
Valentina Karavayeva (1951–1953)
Alexay Dikyi (1952–1955)
Boris Babochkin (1952–1953)
Iosif Tumanov (1953–196)1
Alexander Shatov (1954–1961)
Kira Fyodorova (1955–)
Faina Ranevskaya (1955–1963)
 Lyudmila Skopina (1956–1992)
Valentin Vlasov (1958–)
Ksenya Kuprina (1958–1981)
Nikolai Petrov (1956–1960)
Liliana Aleshnikova (1958–1959)
Zinaida Kiriyenko (1958–1959)
Lyudmila Antonyuk (1960–2000)
Leonard Varfolomeev (1960–1962)
Lilya Gritsenko (1960–1988)
Boris Ravenskikh (1960–1970)
Roman Filippov (1960–1961)
Valentin Burov (1960–2009)
Vladimir Vysotsky (1960–1962)
Leonid Markov (1960–1965)
Vladimir Rautbart (1960–1963)
Evgeny Shutov (1960–1963)
Yuri Gorobets (196онЗ1–1971)
Lev Barashkov (1961–1966)
Alexey Loktev (1962–1972)
Vladimir Safronov (1962–1972)
Afanasy Kochetkov (1962–1979)
Valentin Abramov (1963–1976)
Oleg Borisov (1963–1964)
Svetlana Besedina (1963–1990)
Romuald Vildan (1964–2009)
Oskar Remez (1964–1972)
 Yuri Averin (1965–1984)
Valentina Arkhangelskaya (1965–1999)
Igor Pushkaryov (1965–1966)
Valery Nosik (1965–1972)
 Vitaly Bezrukov (1969–1980)
Yuri Nikolayev (1970–1975)
Boris Tolmazov (1970–1978)
Konstantin Grigoriev (1973–1981)
Svetlana Rodina (1975–1989)
Alexander Myagchenkov (1975–1989)
 Alexey Bulatov (1976–1993)
Alexander Abramov (II) (1978–1987)
Vitaly Maksimov (1979–1986)
Boris Galkin (1980–1982)
 Irina Malysheva (1981–2000)
Alexander Porokhovshchikov (1981–2012)
Svetlana Miseri (1980–1995)
Alexander Ermakov (1981–1995)
Sergey Zernov (1983–1990)
 Boris Morozov (1983–1987)
 Maria Zubareva (1983–1993)
Elena Skorokhodova (1983–1999)
Alexey Guskov (1984 – 1986, 1994 – 2003)
 Georgy Burkov (1984–1987)
Galina Samoylova (1985–1995)
Oleg Antonov (1985–1990)
Alexander Tereshko (1985–1989)
Viktor Naymushin (1986–1991)
Alexander Barinov (1986–1996)
Andrey Tashkov (1987–1999)
Valery Barinov (1988–1991)
Vasily Funtikov (1989–2000)
Elena Novikova (1993–2004)
Yulia Terentyeva (2000–2001)
Roman Kozak (2001–2010)
Anton Pampushny (2004–2007)
Nikolai Fomenko (2006–2010)
Maria Golubkina (2006–2010)

Present
 Tamara Lyakina (1960)
 Elena Sitko (1960)
Nina Marushina (1962)
Yuri Rumyantsev (1964)
Vera Alentova (1965)
Nina Popova (1966)
Alexey Govorukho (1970)
Maria Osipova (1970)
Vitaly Edininskov (1972)
Alexey Teryokhin (1974)
 Vladimir Grigoryev (III) (1975)
 Irina Pulina (1977)
Viktor Vasilyev (1975)
Vera Leskova (1984)
Irina Byakova (1987)
Andrey Mayorov (1988)
Inna Kara-Mosko (1972)
Andrey Dubovsky (1988)
Natalia Nikolayeva (1988)
Igor Bochkin (1990)
Marina Andreeva-Yavorskaya (1990)
Natalya Korogodova (1992)
Konstantin Pokhmelov (1993)
Andrey Sukhov (1993)
Ekaterina Sibiryakova (1993)
Vladimir Nikolenko (1994)
Sergey Lanbamin (1996)
Viktoria Tripolina (1999)
Ekaterina Klochkova (2000)
 Anrdey Sokolov (II) (2000)
Sergey Zavodnyuk (2000)
Sergey Miller (2000)
Alexander Arsentyev (2001)
Viktoria Isakova (2001)
Alexander Anisimov (2001)
Alexey Dadonov (2001)
Vera Voronkova (2002)
Boris Dyachenko (2002)
Alexey Voropanov (2003)
Irina Petrova (2003)
Denis Yasik (2003)
Ilya Barabanov (2003)
Alexander Matrosov (2003)
Alexandra Ursulyak (2003)
Natalya Reva-Ryadinskaya (2004)
Vladimir Zherebtsov (2005)
Alexay Frandetti (2006)
Anna Begunova (2006)
Anastasia Lebedeva (2007)
Viktor Verzhbitsky (2007)
Elizaveta Lotova (2007)
Anastasia Panina (2007)
Vladimir Motashnev (2007)
Evgeny Plitkin (2007)
Igor Teplov (2007)
Alexey Rakhmanov (2007)
Andrey Sirotin (2010)
Anton Feoktistov (2011)
Nikolai Kislitchenko (2011)

References

Theatres in Moscow
Theatre companies in Russia
1950 establishments in Russia
Performing groups established in 1950
Cultural heritage monuments of federal significance in Moscow